River Knobs is a name applied to several terrain features in the eastern United States, including:

River Knobs, in Hawkins County, Tennessee
River Knobs, in Hancock County, Tennessee
River Knobs, in Rhea County, Tennessee
River Knobs, in Roane County, Tennessee
River Knobs, in Lee County, Virginia
River Knobs, in Washington County, Virginia
River Knobs (West Virginia), in Pendleton County, West Virginia